Dryagin is a Russian masculine surname, its feminine counterpart is Dryagina. It may refer to
Aleksandr Dryagin (born 1972), Russian bandy player
Vyacheslav Dryagin (1940–2002), Soviet Nordic combined skier
Irina Dryagina (1921–2017), squadron commissar in the "Night Witches"

Russian-language surnames